Oliva undatella is a species of sea snail, a marine gastropod mollusk in the family Olividae, the olives.

Subspecies
 Oliva undatella ecuadoriana Petuch & Sargent, 1986: synonym of Oliva undatella Lamarck, 1811
 Oliva undatella equadoriana [sic] accepted as Oliva undatella Lamarck, 1811 (misspelling)
 Oliva undatella undatella Lamarck, 1811: synonym of Oliva undatella Lamarck, 1811

Description
The length of the shell varies between 10 mm and 25 mm.

Distribution
This marine species occurs from the Gulf of  California, Mexico to Peru.

References

External links
 Lamarck (J.B.M.de). (1811). Suite de la détermination des espèces de Mollusques testacés. Annales du Muséum National d'Histoire Naturelle. 16: 300-328.
 Duclos, P. L. (1835-1840). Histoire naturelle générale et particulière de tous les genres de coquilles univalves marines a l'état vivant et fossile publiée par monographie. Genre Olive. Paris: Institut de France. 33 plates: pls 1-12
 MNHN, Paris: syntype

undatella